John Boyd was the primary pen-name of Boyd Bradfield Upchurch (October 3, 1919 – June 8, 2013), an American science fiction author. His best known work is his first science fiction novel, The Last Starship from Earth, published in 1968. Boyd wrote eleven science fiction novels, five other novels, and one biography. The majority of his novels were published by US publisher Weybright & Talley, with later ones appearing from science fiction publishers. He was born in Atlanta, Georgia.

Science fiction novels 
 The Last Starship from Earth (1968, Weybright & Talley)
 The Pollinators of Eden (1969, Weybright & Talley. 1971, France: as La Planète Fleur, published by Denoël, series: Présence du Futur #140)
 The Rakehells of Heaven (1969)  Weybright & Talley, Gollancz, Bantam, Pan, Penguin [Edition adds Preface]
 Sex and the High Command (1970) Weybright & Talley, Bantam
 The Organ Bank Farm (1970) Weybright & Talley, Bantam
 The Doomsday Gene (1972) Weybright & Talley
 The I. Q. Merchant (1972) Weybright & Talley
 The Gorgon Festival (1972) Weybright & Talley, Bantam
 Andromeda Gun (1974) Berkley Putnam, Berkley
 Barnard's Planet (1975) Berkley Putnam, Berkley
 The Girl with the Jade Green Eyes (1978) Viking, Penguin

Other novels 
 The Slave Stealer (as Boyd Upchurch) (1968, Weybright & Talley) historical novel set during the US slavery period.
 Scarborough Hall (1976) [as Boyd Upchurch] Berkley. ghost story involving the slavery period.

Short fiction 
 "The Girl and the Dolphin" (Galaxy March–April 1973)

Nonfiction books 
 Behind Every Bush: Treason or Patriotism? (1979) [as Boyd Upchurch, with Representative Richard H Ichord] a look at the House Committee on Un-American Activities, of which Ichord served as chair (1969-1975) after its change of name to the House Internal Security Committee

Nonfiction 
 "What It Means To Write Science Fiction" (in Science Fiction: The Academic Awakening (ed. Willis E. McNelly) (College English Association, 1974)

Definition of science fiction
Boyd has written on science fiction, giving a definition of the genre as "storytelling, usually imaginative as distinct from realistic fiction, which poses the effects of current or extrapolated scientific discoveries, or a single discovery, on the behavior of individuals [or] society."

References

External links
 

20th-century American novelists
20th-century American male writers
American male novelists
American science fiction writers
1919 births
2013 deaths
American male short story writers
20th-century American short story writers